Geothermobarometry is the science of measuring the previous pressure and temperature history of a metamorphic or intrusive igneous rocks. Geothermobarometry is a combination of geobarometry, where a pressure of mineral formation is resolved, and geothermometry where a temperature of formation is resolved.

Methodology
Geothermobarometry relies upon understanding the temperature and pressure of the formation of  minerals within metamorphic and igneous rocks, and is particularly useful in metamorphic rocks. There are several methods of measuring the temperature or pressure of mineral formation relying on chemical equilibrium between metamorphic minerals or by measuring the chemical composition of individual minerals.

Thermobarometry relies upon the fact that mineral pairs/assemblages vary their compositions as a function of temperature and pressure. There are numerous extra factors to consider such as oxygen fugacity and water activity (roughly, the same as concentration). The distribution of component elements between the mineral assemblages is then analysed using an electron microprobe or scanning electron microscope (SEM).

Data on the geothermometers and geobarometers is derived from both laboratory studies on artificial mineral assemblages, where minerals are grown at known temperatures and pressures and the chemical equilibrium measured directly, and from calibration using natural systems.

For example, one of the best known and most widely applicable geothermometers is the garnet-biotite relationship where the relative proportions of Fe and Mg in garnet and biotite change with increasing temperature, so measurement of the compositions of these minerals to give the Fe-Mg distribution between them allows the temperature of crystallization to be calculated, given some assumptions.

Assumptions
In natural systems,  the chemical reactions occur in open systems with unknown geological and chemical histories, and application of geothermobarometers relies on several assumptions that must hold in order for the laboratory data and natural compositions to relate in a valid fashion:

 That the full mineralogical assemblage required for the thermobarometer is present. If not all of the minerals of the reaction are present, or did not equilibrate with each other simultaneously, then any pressures and temperatures calculated for the ideal reaction will deviate from those actually experienced by the rock.
 That chemical equilibrium was achieved to a satisfactory degree. This could be impossible to demonstrate definitively, if the minerals of the thermobarometer assemblage are not all observed in contact with each other.
 That any minerals in a two-mineral barometer or thermometer grew in equilibrium, which is assumed when the minerals are seen to be in contact.
 That the mineral assemblage has not been altered by retrograde metamorphism, which can be assessed using an optical microscope in most cases.
 That certain mineralogical assemblages are present. Without these, the accuracy of a reading may be altered from an ideal, and there may be more error inherent in the measurement.
 That minerals present in thin section are in the same solid solution state as in the model. Many minerals such as feldspars and augite have a range of solid solution variations. Each variation can effect the model and the way a rock is metamorphosed over time.

Techniques
Some techniques include:

Geothermometers
 Ti saturation content of biotite mica.
 Fe-Mg exchange between garnet-biotite and garnet-amphibole.
 Mg-Fe systematics in pigeonites and augites 
 Zr content of rutile, effective for higher temperatures than the Ti-in-biotite thermometer. Requires quartz, rutile, and zircon to be equilibrated.
 Ti-in-zircon crystallization thermometer 
Note that the Fe-Mg exchange thermometers are empirical (laboratory tested and calibrated) as well as calculated based on a theoretical thermodynamic understanding of the components and phases involved. The Ti-in-biotite thermometer is solely empirical and not well understood thermodynamically.

Geobarometers
 GASP; an acronym for the assemblage garnet-(Al2SiO5)-silica(quartz)-plagioclase
 GPMB; an acronym for the assemblage garnet-plagioclase-muscovite-biotite
 Garnet-plagioclase-hornblende-quartz.
 Hornblende 

Various mineral assemblages rely more upon pressure than temperature; for example reactions which involve a large volume change. At high pressure, specific minerals assume lower volumes (therefore density increases, as the mass does not change) - it is these minerals which are good indicators of paleo-pressure.

Software
Software includes:
  Thermo-Calc Software
  THERMOCALC (Holland & Powell)

Clinopyroxene thermobarometry
The mineral clinopyroxene is used for temperature and pressure calculations of the magma that produced igneous rock containing this mineral.

See also

References

 Winter, D.John.Thermodynamics of metamorphic reactions: Geothermobarometry, 543-556
 Henry, D. J., Guidotti, C. V. and Thomson, J. A. (2005) The Ti-saturation surface for low-to-medium pressure metapelitic biotite: Implications for Geothermometry and Ti-substitution Mechanisms.  American Mineralogist, 90, 316-328.
 Guidotti, C. V., Cheney, J. T. and Henry, D. J. (1988) Compositional variation of biotite as a function of metamorphic reactions and mineral assemblage in the pelitic schists of western Maine: American Journal of Science-Wones Memorial Volume, v. 288A, 270-292.

External links
  Thermo-Calc Software - this can be purchased online with a range of databases however there is also a free Educational Package on their website https://thermocalc.com/academia/free-educational-package/
  THERMOCALC (Holland & Powell) - currently free to download online for everyone with a range of databases available. See the download guide at: https://hpxeosandthermocalc.org/the-thermocalc-software/thermocalc-get-started/thermocalc-download-guide/

Metamorphic petrology
Igneous petrology
Geologic modelling